Hyssna IF is a Swedish football club located in Hyssna.

Background
Hyssna IF currently plays in Division 4 Västergötland Södra which is the sixth tier of Swedish football. They play their home matches at the Ekäng in Hyssna.

The club is affiliated to Västergötlands Fotbollförbund.

Season to season

Footnotes

External links
 Hyssna IF – Official website
 Hyssna IF on Facebook

Football clubs in Västra Götaland County
Association football clubs established in 1948
1948 establishments in Sweden